The  is a Kofun period burial mound located on the border of the town of Mibu, Shimotsuga District, and the city of Tochigi in Tochigi Prefecture in the northern Kantō region of Japan. It received protection as a National Historic Site in 1970.

Overview
The Azuma Kofun is located on a narrow plateau between the Ogawa and Sugata rivers, which run north and south through the northern Kantō Plain. As a result of an archaeological excavation from 2007 to 2010, it was determined that the tumulus is a  built in two tiers. The lower tier (base) is wide, and with a total length of about 128 meters was found to be the largest in the prefecture. The second tier is about 86 meters long with a height of about 10 meters. The two-tiered mound is set on a base of similar shape, and is surrounded by a moat with a width of about 20 meters and a depth of about three meters. Pumice deposits from the 1108 AD eruption of Mount Asama were confirmed from the soil filling the moat. The burial facility is a horizontal hole type stone chamber with dimensions of 2.4 meters long x 1.7 meters wide x 2.0 meters high; however, during the Edo period, the front part of the rectangular portion of the tumulus was destroyed, and the entrance stone and one of the ceiling stones were removed by the daimyō of Mibu Domain for use as ornamental stones in the gardens of Mibu Castle, where they can still be seen. The entrance stone was of cut tuff with a rectangular opening for a door, whereas the ceiling stone (and remaining stones in the walls and remaining ceiling of the burial chamber) are of monolithic diorite. Red pigment was applied to the walls of the burial chamber, which was backfilled for preservation after the 2010 excavation.

The surface of the tumulus is covered with fukiishi stones. Fragments of cylindrical and house-shaped haniwa have been recovered.  The tumulus is a representative example of a kofun of the late Kofun period, from around the latter half of the 6th century. Recovered artifacts, including small objects of gold and copper found in the burial chamber, are on display at the Shimotsuke Fudoki-ga-oka Museum at site, which is located approximately eight minutes by car from Mibu Station on the Tōbu Railway Tōbu Utsunomiya Line.

Gallery

See also

List of Historic Sites of Japan (Tochigi)

References

External links

 Tochigi Tourist Information 
 Mibu Department of Education 

Kofun
History of Tochigi Prefecture
Mibu, Tochigi
Tochigi, Tochigi
Historic Sites of Japan
Shimotsuke Province